Baron Holland, of Holland in the County of Lincoln, and Baron Holland of Foxley, of Foxley in the County of Wiltshire, were two titles in the Peerage of Great Britain. The first barony was created on 7 March 1762 for Lady Caroline Fox, the daughter of Charles Lennox, 2nd Duke of Richmond and the eldest of the famous Lennox sisters. The second barony was created on 17 April 1763 for her husband, the prominent Whig politician Henry Fox. Lord and Lady Holland were both succeeded by their eldest son, the second Baron. He had previously represented Salisbury in Parliament. On his early death in 1774 the titles passed to his only son, the third Baron. He was also an influential Whig politician and notably served as Lord Privy Seal from 1806 to 1806 in the Ministry of All the Talents. He was succeeded by his eldest legitimate son, the fourth Baron. He sat as Member of Parliament for Horsham. He had four daughters but no sons and on his death in 1859 the titles became extinct.

The politician Charles James Fox was the second son of the first Baron and Baroness. The first Baron Holland of Foxley was the second and youngest son from the second marriage of the politician Sir Stephen Fox, and the younger brother of Stephen Fox-Strangways, 1st Earl of Ilchester, whose title was created with remainder to Henry Fox failing any heirs male of his body. Charles Richard Fox was the illegitimate son of the third Baron by his mistress and future wife, Lady Webster.

Barons Holland, of Holland (1762)
Georgiana Caroline Fox, 1st Baroness Holland (1723–1774)
Stephen Fox, 2nd Baron Holland (1747–1774)
Henry Richard Vassall-Fox, 3rd Baron Holland (1773–1840)
Henry Edward Fox, 4th Baron Holland (1802–1859)

Barons Holland, of Foxley (1763)
Henry Fox, 1st Baron Holland (1705–1774)
Stephen Fox, 2nd Baron Holland (1747–1774)
Henry Richard Vassall-Fox, 3rd Baron Holland (1773–1840)
Henry Edward Fox, 4th Baron Holland (1802–1859)

See also
Baron Holand
Earl of Holland
Earl of Ilchester
Duke of Richmond

References

Baronies in the Peerage of Great Britain
Extinct baronies in the Peerage of Great Britain
Fox family (English aristocracy)